Rhizoctonia theobromae is a species of fungus in the order Cantharellales. Basidiocarps (fruit bodies) are thin, effused, and web-like. The species is tropical to sub-tropical and is mainly known as a plant pathogen, the causative agent of vascular-streak dieback of cocoa (Theobroma cacao).

See also
 List of cacao diseases

References

External links

Fungal tree pathogens and diseases
Cacao diseases
Agaricomycetes
Cantharellales
Fungal plant pathogens and diseases
Fungi described in 1971
Fungi of Asia